Gonzalo Ezequiel Rodriguez (born 4 October 1997 in Buenos Aires) is an Argentine professional footballer who plays as a central midfielder for Club Atlético Vélez Sarsfield.

Rodriguez made his debut for Velez Sarsfield in the Argentine Primera División on April 21, 2018 against Temperley coming on a substitute for Mauro Zárate.

References

Living people
1997 births
Footballers from Buenos Aires
Argentine footballers
Argentine Primera División players
Club Atlético Vélez Sarsfield footballers
Association football midfielders